Halotherapy (also known as speleotherapy when practiced inside caves) is a form of alternative medicine which makes use of salt. Halotherapy is an unproven treatment that lacks scientific credibility.  Spa owners attribute a wide range of health benefits to halotherapy.

Norman Edelman of the American Lung Association suggests that, for people with obstructive lung diseases, halotherapy might be more than placebo effect. He speculates that inhaled salt particles might thin out mucus aiding patients in expelling sputum. However, a recent review of the research supporting halotherapy determined that, out of 151 studies conducted on this topic, only 1 was a well-designed randomized control trial that met their inclusion criteria for a meta-analysis.

History 
Many forms of halotherapy have been used for millennia. The earliest known mention of spa resorts date back to 12th-century Poland, in which people were urged to bathe in mineral waters. Modern history of halotherapy dates back to 1843, when a Polish physician named Feliks Boczkowski promoted the idea of salt treatment after noticing that workers at salt mines, unlike other miners, did not have respiratory or lung problems. In those regions where there are natural karst caves as well as numerous salt tunnels and salt mines, therapeutic centers for asthma sufferers have been established since the 1950s, notably in Slovakia, Romania, as well as Ukraine, in addition to Poland.

Forms 
There are several forms of halotherapy:
 Saline solution inhalations
 Dry salt aerosol inhalations
 Irrigation and lavage
 Saline and brine baths
 Taking the waters (crenotherapy)

See also
 Balneotherapy, the medical use of bathing
 Speleotherapy
 Thalassotherapy, the medical use of seawater

References

External links

 

Alternative medical treatments
Hydrotherapy
Naturopathy